HMS Badger was a Dutch hoy, one of some 19 that the Admiralty purchased for the Royal Navy in 1794 after France's declaration of war in 1793. The intent was to create quickly a class of gun-vessels for operations in coastal and shallow waters. Of all the hoys, she had probably the most distinguished career in that she helped fend off two French attacks on the Îles Saint-Marcouf, and participated in the capture of several French vessels. The Navy sold her in 1802.

Career
Badger was fitted out at Deptford between April and 25 May 1794, with Lieutenant Lewis Mortlock commissioning her in April.
Smith constructed barracks and gun batteries and manned the islands with 500 sailors and Royal Marines, including a large proportion of men unfit for ship-board service, described as "invalids". Lieutenant Charles Papps Price assumed command of Badger in August 1795, with Mortlock moving to command of the newly captured and commissioned Crachefeu. For administrative purposes, the Navy rated Badger a sloop-of-war, and technically gave Price command of both the Saint-Marcouf islands.

Price was  an unpopular officer who had repeatedly been passed over for promotion. He apparently spent most of his time on the islands with a prostitute he had brought from Portsmouth.

On 7 September 1795 the French mounted an attack with 17 large boats filled with men. They retreated in confusion after coming under fire from the redoubts the British had erected on East Island and from the gunvessels, among them the hoys Badger, Hawk, and Sandfly.

On 28 December 1796, Badger and Sandfly captured Rebekah. Next year, on 21 February 1797, Badger, Sandfly, and the hired armed cutters Champion and Fly captured Souris. Souris was a chasse-maree of 16 guns. Unlike her sister-ship Eclair, which the British had captured in 1795, the Royal Navy did not take Souris into service.  

Near the end of the year, on 12 November 1797, Badger and Sandfly captured the French vessels Eole and Solide Michael. One week later Badger captured Morgonstern.

On the night of 6 May 1798 the French approached the islands with a large number of armed troop-carrying barges and some brigs to provide covering fire, as well as 5-6,000 troops. They then launched their attack at dawn. The West Island's batteries, under Lieutenant Price, were ready and inflicted devastating damage on the light invasion craft. Despite severe casualties the French barges continued their approach until they were within musket range, . The garrison of Royal Marines opened fire and the artillery crews switched to canister shot. Six or seven boats sank with their entire crews and troops, and others were heavily damaged. Losses were so high that the French called off the attack; even so, the return journey carried the barges past East Island, which was under the command of Lieutenant Richard Bourne of Sandfly and mounted a battery that inflicted additional severe losses.

British casualties were light. For his efforts, Price received promotion to Commander. Nearly five decades later the Admiralty issued the Naval General Service Medal with clasp "Isles St. Marcou" upon application to the three still-living British claimants from the battle.

On 8 July 1799, Badger captured four French vessels: Pierre de Issigny, Fortunee, St. Pierre de Grandcamp, and Amitie. 

What was Badgers last capture occurred on  15 September 1800 when Price sighted a French long cutter some four miles off the West Island. He sent Lieutenant M'Cullen of the Royal Marines with 24 picked men in Badgers ten-oared galley and six-oared cutter to catch the French vessel. He also signaled the gun-brig  to provide covering fire. Sparkler drew the fire of two shore batteries, one of two 24-pounder guns and one of two 12-pounder guns, while the boats went in to cut out the French vessel. The French crew ran their boat on shore and cut her masts and rigging. Nevertheless, the British towed her off despite heavy small-arms fire from the shore. The prize was the privateer rowboat Victoire, mounting four swivel guns, 26 oars, and having a crew of at least 40 men, under the command of Captain Barier. Price described her as "quite new... the completest Boat for the Service of the Islands that possibly could be constructed." The only British casualty was Badgers gunners mate, who took a musket ball to the shoulder.

Fate
Badger was paid off in May 1802 and was sold later that year.

Notes, citations, and references
Notes

Citations

References
 
 

 
 
  
 

Hoys of the Royal Navy
1790s ships